The Rumpler G.I was a bomber aircraft produced in Germany during World War I, together with refined versions known as the G.II and G.III.

Design and development
Based on a prototype with the factory designation 4A15, the G.I and its successors were built to a conventional bomber design for their time, two-bay biplanes with unstaggered wings of unequal span. The pilot sat in an open cockpit just forward of the wings, and open positions were provided in the nose and amidships for a gunner and observer. The engines were mounted pusher-fashion in nacelles atop the lower wings and enclosed in streamlined cowlings. Fixed tricycle undercarriage was fitted, with dual wheels on each unit.

The G.II version was almost identical, but featured more powerful engines and carried a second 7.92 mm (.312 in) machine gun and increased bombload. The G.III was again similar, but had engine nacelles that were now mounted on short struts clear of the lower wing.

Variants

 4A15 - prototype with Benz Bz.III engines
 5A15 - G.I production version with single machine gun and Benz Bz.III or Mercedes D.III engines (c. 60 built)
 5A16 - G.II production version with Benz Bz.IV engines and two machine guns (c. 72 built)
 6G2 - G.III production version with Mercedes D.IVa engines and two machine guns (c. 90 built)

Specifications (G.III)

Notes

References

 

 
 

1910s German bomber aircraft
G.I
Biplanes
Twin-engined pusher aircraft
Aircraft first flown in 1915